Ruth Blackburn (born 27 May 1992) is an Australian football (soccer) player who last played for Australian W-League team Brisbane Roar.

Personal life
Outside of her sports career, she has worked as a researcher. Her work has included research into the use of medical cannabis for children with epilepsy.

Honours
With Brisbane Roar:
 W-League Premiership: 2008–09
 W-League Championship: 2008–09

References

External links 

 

Australian women's soccer players
Living people
Brisbane Roar FC (A-League Women) players
Adelaide United FC (A-League Women) players
1992 births
Soccer players from Brisbane
Women's association football defenders